Obasute may refer to:

 Ubasute, the alleged former Japanese practice of abandoning the elderly to die
 Obasute Station, a railway station in Japan